Bibiladeniye Mahanama Thero is a Buddhist monk of the Theravada Order. The thero is the only Buddhist priest in Asia of the Theravada order to actively engage in the experimentation and the creative exploration of music as a form of aesthetic expression.  The thero has been actively engaged with the art, both on overseas projects as well as in Sri Lanka for nearly two decades.

Share the Love, the album released in 2014, is his very first experimental attempt on Spirituality and Relaxation.  The album was released in Europe, Asia and Sri Lanka. In 2015 the album was awarded the prestigious State Music Award for the best album produced in Sri Lanka.

In 2017, the venerable entered the world of cinema with the musical direction debut on the film Girivassipura’ directed by Devinda Konhahage. It is recorded that this is the first ever time a Buddhist priest achieved such a milestone.
 Since then, he has worked on many films, documentaries, theme songs and musical pieces.

Bibiladeniye Mahanama Thero also works on a variety of Meditation, Mental well-being and Mood Uplifting music experimentations within the mobile App space. On this platform his most notable are with Mind Supply of the USA and Rest Tech India are notable.

The Thero is also recognized as the pioneer who introduced Conceptual Musical Short Films to Sri Lanka. In 2019, he started work on the first Conceptual Musical Short Film – Wallstory. It was released on the digital stream in 2020. This was a milestone for the Sri Lankan Cinema Music industry. On the 21st of September, 2021 on World Peace Day, he released the second Conceptual Musical Short Film – Piece for Peace, to celebrate peace and inter-religious harmony.

The thero’s contribution to society is not limited to only music, cinema, Buddhist philosophy and spiritual harmony. The creative contribution too is immense. The most notable being the restoration of the research based “Jathaka” Stories Recitals project in 2015-16. The “Jathaka Katha” (Jathaka Stories) is one of the most important works of literature in the Theravada Buddhist Tradition. With the participation of over 150 Buddhist monks, the Jathaka Stories were recorded in the traditional Jathaka Stories recital form. The project was envisioned as a means of preserving the traditional recital of Jathaka Stories in its original style, for posterity. The restoration work is a 500 plus hour voice recording project that was overlooked by Venerable Bibiladeniye Mahanama thero.

Venerable Bibiladeniye Mahanama Thero is also the Music Director from the Sri Lankan end, on the Television drama series “You Are Always with Me”, jointly produced by the People’s Republic of China and the Democratic Socialist Republic of Sri Lanka. It is the first Television Drama series co-produced between Sri Lanka and China and was directed by Cui Yali.

Even at this young age, he holds various positions in global associations working that work on environmental and animal welfare, as well as multi-religious and welfare organizations. The thero is also the founder of the Share the Love Foundation Of Ceylon and Sandhara Spiritual Buddhist Aesthetics & Arts Centre.

Early life and education
Bibiladeniye Mahanama was born on 31 October 1989 at the government hospital in Dompe. His birth name, Wanaviraja Wasala Mudhiyanselage Lahiru Madhusanka, was given to him by his mother, Indrani Tennakoon, and father, Wanaviraja Wasala Mudhiyanselage Abeyratne Bandara. He is the eldest of their three children. Lahiru had his primary education at Jayanthi Central College in Nikaweratiya. He was ordained a Buddhist monk on 27 July 1999 and given his present name Bibiladeniye Mahanama. He is a student of Wahantare Siddhartha thero at Sri Shailathalaramaya - Panduwasnuwara. His initial Pirivena education was at the Paramadhamma Cheitiya Pirivena in Ratmalana since 1999, and continued his higher studies at the Sri Pandukabhya Pirivena in Panduwasnuwara. His Advanced Level education was at the Kurunegala Baudhaloka Vidyawarthana Pirivena under the guidance of Wahantare Siddhartha Thero.

He was awarded a scholarship to study computer science and music at the Kobeigana-Crasda Computer Institute, where he later worked as lecturer for two years from the age of 17. With the encouragement of Wahanthare Siddhartha Thero, he studied North Indian music styles and guitar technique under the musician Danister Perera. Bibiladeniye Mahanama was awarded a full scholarship by musician Dilup Gabadamudalige to study at his institute for computerised music and sound engineering in Pelawatte for two years – 2007–2009.He also studied the basics of North Indian vocal styles under the musician and professor, Dayaratne Ranatunge and Usthad Gulam Nihaz Khan in Mumbai.

Music career
Bibiladeniye Mahanama went on to work with professional musicians in Sri Lanka and internationally as a composer, director, music arranger, and recording artist.

Music arrangement and composition
 Thimiraya, short film directed by Vidarshana Rathnayake – 2008 
 Marayage Maga, short film directed by Isuru Sandakelum – 2008
 Paligenima, short film directed by Vidarshana Rathnayake – 2008
 Akashadeepa, television film with Karthik Sharma (India), directed by Sakkarebailu Srinivas – 2012
 Sheela & Marius, animated film based on the children's book by Predi Vukovi (Switzerland) –  2012
  Solo Buddhist Song Project,Produced by University of Visual and Performing art – Colombo –  2013
  Documentary Film, Produced by Sri Lankan General Hospital Service - 2015
  Theme music , Produced by Sri Lankan Lawyers Association's Social Awareness - 2016
  Sasara Wassanaya - Derana Tv , Produced by Devinda Koongahage - 2016
  Girivassipura , Directed by Devinda Koongahage - Upcoming  
 The Hospital Service, Documentary Film - Colombo Hospital Service - 2017
 Vajirarama Dhamma school, Documentary Film for Celebrating Century - 2018 
 Adithya Ayurvedic Hospital Profile, Documentary Film - 2019 
 You are always with Me, China - Sri Lanka Collaboration television Film  - 2019 
 Mahinda Madihaheva Profile, Documentary Film - 2019
 Ramesh Pathirana Profile, Documentary Film - 2020
 Chandu, Sri Lankan Election Commission Campaign themes - 2020
 Sri Lanka Signal Crops, Sri Lankan Army Signal Crops Documentary - 2020
 Climate Change, Secretariat Sri Lanka - TVC Series With Ruwan Costa, 2020
 Gandhara - Buddhist Heritage of Pakistan, A Documentary Film produced by "High Commission of Pakistan in Sri Lanka - 2021

,

Music and background recordings

 Karuna Nadee, Buddhist oratorio by Dinesh Subasinghe – 2010
 Sundarai Premaya, television drama directed by Chandrathna Mapitigama, with music direction by Dinesh Subasinghe – 2007–2009
 Hitata Wahal Vimi, television drama directed by Mohan Niyaz with music direction by Dinesh Subasinghe
 Sihina Wasanthaya, television drama (final episode) directed by Sunil Costa, Sanjaya Nirmal, and Saranga Mendis with music direction by Dinesh Subasinghe
 Me Uyanata Mal Genna film directed by Chandrathna Mapitigama with music direction by Dinesh Subasinghe – 2009–2010
 Hiru Dutu Malak, film directed by Cleatus Mendis with music direction by Dinesh Subasinghe  – 2011
 Surangana Lovin Evilla, film directed by Suneth Malinga Lokuhewa with music direction by Dinesh Subasinghe – 2011–2012
 Siwamma Dhanapala, stage play by Tennyson Cooray with music direction by Dinesh Subasinghe  – 2012
 Kaviya , An Educational Poem Collection with Ranjith Premaweera – 2016
 Dhamma School Theme Song , Reproduction by Sirsa TV with Ranjith Premaweera – 2016
 Jathaka GATHA - PEO TV Poem - 2018
 Kurulu Geesara , An Educational Song Collection with Chamra Ruwanthilaka – 2019

Soundtracks
 Derana Little Star with Peshala Manoj
 Symphony of Buddhism
 Nature and Environment, lengthy instrumental work with nature sounds, with Sri Lanka Nature forum
 Kataragama, with Nimantha Heshan
 "Share the Love" theme music and "In this Environment" for the Share the Love open-air concert at Battaramulla on 4 July 2011.
 Sheela & Marius, animated film based on the children's book by Predi Vukovi (Switzerland) –  2012
 Derana Little Star - Final - Soundtrack  - 2016 with Peshala Manoj
 Nidahasata Pakshawemu  - 2017
 Youth Wesak - UN WESAK DAY  - 2018
 Iti Pahanweta - Easter Day Attac Memorial  - 2019
 Mind Supply Relaxation Music Collection  - 2020
 Maliban Buiscut Cooprate with mama's boys Films  - 2020
 AIA Insurance (Director Cuts) with Nilan Cooray  - 2020

Albums
 Premaye Namen, with Charith Priyadhammika – 2007
 Sudu Piyumak Se, children's song album, with Lahiru Chamalka, – 2008
 Sansara Sangramaye, collection of Buddhist songs performed by Sri Lankan singers, with Dinesh Subasinghe
 Kampitha Sewaneli, collection of songs by Jayasena Kottegoda performed by Sri Lankan singers
 Share the Love relaxation Music album – 2014,
Breath Of Life - Upcoming

Awards
 "State Music Awards - 2015" for Best album For Share the Love relaxation Music album"

Other
 Sri Lanka National Drugs Prevention & Operation Unit theme song
 Sri Lanka Environmental Ministry theme song (2009)
 Bo Sevana Pre-School theme song, Bo Sevana Foundation
 "Rima Rima", theme for Yanni's holiday celebration by Street Team 2010, with Dinesh Subasinghe
"Independence" theme song on Sirasa Superstar Generation 04, with Nimantha Heshan
 Pansiya Panas Jathaka Poth Wahanse, Audio Version of 548 Stories
 "Buddhist chanting Sutras" with Omalpe Sobhitha Thero – 2015

References

External links
 Official website
 Profile on talenthouse.com

Sri Lankan composers
Sinhalese musicians
Sri Lankan film score composers
Buddhist music
1989 births
Living people